Legion Field is a 4,500 seat baseball stadium located in Greenville, Mississippi.  It hosted the Greenville Bluesmen from 1996 to 2001.

References

Minor league baseball venues
Baseball venues in Mississippi
Buildings and structures in Washington County, Mississippi